The Commission for Science, Technology and Industry for National Defense (COSTIND; Chinese: 国防科学技术工业委员会) was a civilian ministry within the State Council of the People's Republic of China, responsible for setting policy for defense procurement.  It was considered as the Chinese counterpart of DARPA of the US. The ministry was formed in 1982 to centralize Chinese defense procurement and technology whose responsibility had been distributed among several agencies. In March 2008 COSTIND was merged into a new super bureaucracy called the Ministry of Industry and Information Technology (MIIT) and renamed as the State Administration for Science, Technology and Industry for National Defence (SASTIND). Former COSTIND deputy director, Chen Qiufa, was named as the head of SASTIND.

According to the Nuclear Threat Initiative, the China Atomic Energy Authority was part of COSTIND.

History
In the late-1990s, there was a massive reorganization of the Chinese defense industry. The main focus of this reorganization was to separate the purchasing of weaponry which became the responsibility of the General Armaments Division of the People's Liberation Army, the production and development of weaponry which became the responsibility of several different enterprises such as China Northern Industries and China Southern Industries which were state-owned but not under direct state management, and the development of policy for these industries which became the responsibility of COSTIND. Because of the massive change in COSTIND, many analysts referred to the new COSTIND and the old COSTIND.

COSTIND played an important role in the space program of China as one of its subagencies the China National Space Administration is responsible for Chinese space policy. COSTIND administered the China Engineering and Technology Information Network (CETIN), which has been described as a "one-stop shop for foreign military technology information."

Universities administered by COSTIND
 Beijing Institute of Technology
 Beijing University of Aeronautics and Astronautics
 Harbin Engineering University
 Harbin Institute of Technology
 Northwestern Polytechnical University
 Nanjing Aeronautics and Astronautics University
 Nanjing University of Science and Technology

Enterprises administered by COSTIND
 China Aviation Industry Corporation I
 China Aviation Industry Corporation II
 China North Industries Group Corporation
 China South Industries Group Corporation
 China Shipbuilding Industry Corporation
 China State Shipbuilding Corporation
 China Aerospace Science and Technology Corporation
 China Aerospace Machinery and Electronics Corporation
 China National Nuclear Corporation
 China Nuclear Engineering & Construction Group

List of chairmen
Chen Bin (陈彬)
Ding Henggao (丁衡高)
Cao Gangchuan: 1996–1998
Liu Jibin (刘积斌): 1998–2003
Zhang Yunchuan: 2003–2007
Zhang Qingwei: 2007–2008

See also
Defence Research and Development Organisation (DRDO), Indian counterpart

References

Government ministries of the People's Republic of China
Military of the People's Republic of China
Military acquisition